The National Academy of Psychology (NAOP) is the major national organization of psychologists in India.
The decision to form the organization was made in 1988 by psychologists gathered at Bhopal University.
L. B. Tripathy was the convenor of the advisory committee for drafting the organization's constitution.
The organization was established in 1989.
Ajit K. Mohanty was the first convenor of the NAOP.

Since 2000, the official journal of the NAOP has been Psychological Studies, edited (as of 2015) by Girishwar Misra.

References

External links 
 
 NAOP information page (Union of Psychological Science)

Mental health organisations in India
1989 establishments in Uttar Pradesh
Organisations based in Uttar Pradesh
Organizations established in 1989